The Seth E. Ward Homestead, also known as Ward House or Frederick B. Campbell Residence is a historic home located in the Country Club District, Kansas City, Missouri.  It was designed by Asa Beebe Cross and built in 1871.  It is a two-story, "T"-plan, vernacular Greek Revival style brick dwelling. It features a single story, full-width front verandah. It was a home of Seth E. Ward.

It was listed on the National Register of Historic Places in 1979.

References

Houses on the National Register of Historic Places in Missouri
Greek Revival houses in Missouri
Houses completed in 1871
Houses in Kansas City, Missouri
National Register of Historic Places in Kansas City, Missouri